Terror Glacier is in North Cascades National Park in the U.S. state of Washington, on south slope of Mount Degenhardt. The precipitous McMillan Spire is to the immediate northeast.

See also
List of glaciers in the United States

References

Glaciers of the North Cascades
Cirques of the United States
Glaciers of Whatcom County, Washington
Glaciers of Washington (state)